Nezula is a monotypic moth genus in the family Erebidae. Its only species, Nezula grisea, is found in French Guiana, Venezuela, Suriname, Panama, Upper Amazonas and Ecuador. Both the genus and species were first described by William Schaus in 1896.

References

Phaegopterina
Monotypic moth genera
Moths of Central America
Moths of South America